Carlos Muñoz González (born 1991), better known by his ring name Dralístico, is a Mexican second-generation luchador enmascarado (masked professional wrestler) who currently works for Lucha Libre AAA Worldwide (AAA). He is best known for his eleven-year tenure with Consejo Mundial de Lucha Libre (CMLL), originally working under the ring name Dragon Lee, before he was given the ring name and mask of Místico, after the original Místico had left CMLL to work for WWE.

In CMLL, he is a one-time CMLL World Tag Team Champion, a two-time CMLL World Trios Champion, as well as a one-time holder of the CMLL World Welterweight Championship and the LLA Azteca Championship. Additionally, he has also won the 2012 Torneo Sangre Nueva tournament (as Dragon Lee), and the 2016 CMLL Torneo Nacional de Parejas Increibles tournament (alongside Mephisto).

His father, Arturo Muñoz, is also a professional wrestler, best known by the ring names Poder Mexica, Toro Blanco and Comandante Pierroth, and is working under the ring name La Bestia del Ring. Místico's older brother is better known under the ring name Rush. Místico and Rush's younger brother debuted in November 2013, the latter taking over the Dragon Lee ring name. He has also wrestled in Japan and Europe through CMLL's partnerships with other promotions such as Revolution Pro Wrestling and New Japan Pro-Wrestling, as well as on the Mexican independent circuit.

Professional wrestling career

Consejo Mundial de Lucha Libre (2010–2021)

Dragon Lee (2010–2012)
Muñoz was originally trained in lucha libre (professional wrestling) by his father Arturo Muñoz, brother Rush and uncles Franco Columbo,  Pit Bull I, and Pit Bull II in his native Tala, Jalisco. After two years of training, he moved to Mexico City to join Consejo Mundial de Lucha Libre (CMLL), where he underwent further training under Arturo Beristain and Tony Salazar. Given a mask and the ring name Dragon Lee, he made his public debut on November 25, 2010, when he took part in CMLL's annual bodybuilding contest and won the beginner's category. Dragon Lee made his wrestling debut on January 4, 2011, when he, working as a técnico, teamed with Fabian el Gitano and Starman in a six-man tag team match, where they were defeated by Arkangel de la Muerte, Boby Zavala and Skándalo.

Lee started his career as a member of the informal Generación 2011 group, which also included fellow debutants Zavala, Enrique Vera Jr., Hombre Bala Jr., Magnus, Signo Jr. and Super Halcón Jr. During the following months, Lee wrestled mainly in six-man tag team matches with and against his stablemates, before being involved in first major program the following April, as he participated the Forjando un Ídolo ("Forging an Idol") tournament. With one win and two losses, Dragon Lee finished fourth in his block and failed to advance in the tournament. On April 17, he picked up the biggest win of his young career by winning a ten-man torneo cibernetico. On May 31, Dragon Lee entered a tournament to determine the new CMLL World Super Lightweight Champion, but was eliminated in the semifinal torneo cibernetico. Lee received a title shot against the winner of the tournament, Virus, on November 28, but was unable to dethrone the defending champion. On March 6, 2012, Dragon Lee entered the Torneo Sangre Nueva ("New Blood Tournament"), winning an eight-man torneo cibernetico semifinal match. On March 20, Lee defeated Raziel in the finals to win the tournament. On March 30, Dragon Lee entered the 2012 Torneo Gran Alternativa, teaming with his brother Rush. After victories over the teams of Boby Zavala and Rey Bucanero, and Niebla Roja and Último Guerrero, the brothers were eliminated in the semifinals by Euforia and El Terrible, who won the tournament. Lee's run of tournaments continued the following month with the En Busca de un Ídolo tournament/reality television show, where he finished third and narrowly missed advancing to the finals.

Místico (2012–2021)

On June 20, 2012, CMLL held a press conference, during which lucha libre priest Fray Tormenta announced that since Dragon Lee had impressed him during the En Busca de un Ídolo tournament, he wanted him to take over the role of Místico, his storyline protégé. Lee immediately accepted Tormenta's offer and received his new mask to officially become the second incarnation of Místico, taking over the highly successful role following the character's original performer, who had signed with WWE in January 2011. Lee wrestled his final match under his old persona on June 24, when he, Diamante and Tritón defeated Cancerbero, Niebla Roja and Raziel via disqualification. Afterwards, Roja attacked Lee, removed his mask and tore it to pieces. For the next six weeks, Místico went on a publicity tour to promote the upcoming "new era" of Místico.

The new Místico made his in-ring debut on August 3 on the Super Viernes show in a six-man tag team match, where he teamed with Ángel de Oro and Valiente to defeat Ephesto, Euforia and Mephisto. The debut match caused a spike in CMLL attendance, drawing 12,600 fans to Arena México. The new Místico scored his first direct win the following day, pinning former CMLL World Heavyweight Champion Último Guerrero in a six-man tag team match, where he teamed with Atlantis and Titán against Guerrero, Dragón Rojo Jr. and Negro Casas. On September 30, Místico won his first title, when he defeated Último Guerrero and Atlantis in a three-way match to win the Lucha Libre Azteca (LLA) Azteca Championship. On November 12, New Japan Pro-Wrestling (NJPW) announced that Místico would be making his Japanese debut at Fantastica Mania 2013 in January 2013. Later that same day, Místico was sidelined with an injury, after failing to properly execute a shooting star press, landing on his shoulder.

Místico returned to the ring on January 8, 2013, when he, Máscara Dorada and Titán defeated Los Hijos del Averno (Averno, Ephesto and Mephisto) in a six-man tag team main event. The following day, during a match, where he, Atlantis and Marco Corleone faced Euforia, Último Guerrero and Volador Jr., Místico suffered yet another shoulder injury, following a failed springboard dive, and was rushed to an emergency room. On January 15, NJPW announced that Místico would be unable to wrestle at the Fantastica Mania events due to a dislocated shoulder, but would still attend the events to sign autographs. On January 18, during the first night of the Fantastica Mania weekend, Místico made an appearance, greeting the fans in attendance at Korakuen Hall. Místico returned to the ring on February 18, teaming with La Máscara and La Sombra in a six-man tag team match, where they defeated Los Invasores (Kraneo, Psicosis and Volador Jr.). On April 19, Místico took part in a ten-man torneo cibernetico to determine the contenders for the vacant Mexican National Welterweight Championship. He and Averno survived the match, setting up a title match between the two. On April 26 at the Arena Mexico 57th Anniversary Show, Místico was defeated by Averno in the match for the Mexican National Welterweight Championship.

In May, Místico came together with Máscara Dorada and Valiente to form the Los Estetas del Aire ("The Air Aesthetics") stable with the three debuting identical masks, containing elements of each wrestler's own mask, in the process. On May 12, Místico was stripped of the LLA Azteca Championship, after his title defense, a three-way match with La Sombra and Volador Jr., ended in a thirty-minute time limit draw. On June 9, Los Estetas del Aire entered a tournament for the vacant CMLL World Trios Championship, first defeating Los Invasores (Mr. Águila, Psicosis and Volador Jr.) in the quarterfinals and then TRT (Rey Bucanero, El Terrible and Tiger) in the semifinals to advance to the following week's tournament finals. On June 16, Los Estetas del Aire defeated Los Guerreros Laguneros (Euforia, Niebla Roja and Último Guerrero) to become the new CMLL World Trios Champions. On September 13 at CMLL's 80th Anniversary Show, Los Estetas del Aire successfully defended the CMLL World Trios Championship against Los Revolucionarios del Terror (Dragón Rojo Jr., Pólvora and Rey Escorpión). On January 14, 2014, during the opening event of the Fantastica Mania 2014 tour, Místico made his Japanese in-ring debut, pinning Rey Escorpión to win a six-man tag team main event. Four days later, in the main event of the fourth show of the tour, Místico unsuccessfully challenged Mephisto for the Mexican National Light Heavyweight Championship. Upon his return to Mexico, Místico won his first singles title in CMLL, when he, on February 16, defeated Pólvora for the CMLL World Welterweight Championship. On March 28, Los Estetas del Aire lost the CMLL World Trios Championship to Los Guerreros Laguneros (Euforia, Niebla Roja and Último Guerrero). On May 2, Místico was involved in a motorcycle accident in which he broke both the fibula and tibia in his right leg, forcing him to undergo surgery the following day. During a press conference on November 19 Místico announced that he was not ready to return to the ring and vacated the CMLL World Welterweight Championship.

Místico returned to the ring on January 13, 2015, during the first day of the Fantastica Mania 2015 tour in Osaka, Japan. He teamed with Jyushin Thunder Liger in a tag team match, where they were defeated by Gedo and Pólvora. Místico worked the entire tour opposite Pólvora, culminating in a singles match between the two on January 19, where Místico was victorious. Upon his return to Mexico, Místico formed a new stable named Sky Team with Valiente and Volador Jr. On February 13, Sky Team defeated Los Guerreros Laguneros (Euforia, Niebla Roja and Último Guerrero) to win the CMLL World Trios Championship. In January 2016, Místico returned to Japan for the Fantastica Mania 2016 tour, during which he main evented three of the six shows. Back in CMLL, Místico won the 2016 Torneo Increíble de Parejas, when he and Mephisto defeated Carístico (the original Místico) and Cibernético in the finals on April 29.

The following January, Místico again traveled to Japan to take part in Fantastica Mania 2017. For the 2017 Torneo Nacional de Parejas Increíbles, Místico was paired with Negro Casas, long time rival of both versions of Místico. In the first round they defeated Ripper and Titán, but lost to Valiente and Último Guerrero in the second round. By virtue of being part of the CMLL World Trios Champions, Místico qualified for the 2017 Universal Championship tournament. In the first round he defeated one-third of the Mexican National Trios Champions, Mephisto, but lost to CMLL World Light Heavyweight Champion Niebla Roja in the second round.

Místico and Dragon Lee joined forces to compete in CMLL's 2018 "Brothers tag team tournament" during the Fantastica Mania 2018 tour. The Muñoz brothers defeated El Cuatrero and Sansón in the first round, but lost to Último Guerrero and Gran Guerrero in the finals. Místico and Mephisto once again teamed up for the 2018 Torneo Nacional de Parejas Increíbles, defeating Soberano Jr. and Hechicero in the first round, Gran Guerrero and Niebla Roja in the second round, but lost to Último Guerrero and Volador Jr. in the semi-final match. After 1,234 days as CMLL World Trios Champions, and 10 successful title defenses, Místico participated in his sixth Fantastica Mania tour as CMLL and NJPW held the Fantastica Mania 2019 tour. During the 8 show tour, Místico worked opposite Carístico on several nights, as well as competing in the CMLL family tag team tournament. On August 25, 2021, Místico announced his departure from the promotion after eleven years, and would be known as Dralístico going forward (a portmanteau of his previous ring names).

Lucha Libre AAA Worldwide (2021–present)
On September 4, 2021, it was announced that Dralístico had joined La Facción Ingobernable, alongside his father and his brothers. On October 9, at Héroes Inmortales XIV, Dralístico made his debut for Lucha Libre AAA Worldwide (AAA), when he and Dragon Lee challenged Los Lucha Bros (Fénix and Pentagón Jr.) for the AAA World Tag Team Championship, after they had retained the title over Jinetes del Aire (Hijo del Vikingo and Laredo Kid).

Other promotions

In August, Místico took part in War of the Worlds UK, a tour co-produced by CMLL, NJPW, Revolution Pro Wrestling (RPW) and Ring of Honor (ROH) in the United Kingdom. During the tour's first event on August 18, Místico teamed with NJPW wrestler Jushin Thunder Liger and ROH wrestler Delirious to unsuccessfully challenge Dalton Castle and The Boys for the ROH World Six-Man Tag Team Championship. Místico made an appearance for The Crash Lucha Libre on January 12, 2018, as part of CMLL/The Crash collaboration. Místico and Rey Horus lost to Penta 0M in a three-way match.

In late 2022, Dralístico began to appear in AAA's U.S. partner promotions All Elite Wrestling (AEW) and Ring of Honor (ROH), aligning himself with Rush as part of  La Facción Ingobernable.

Personal life
Carlos Muñoz González was born in 1991 in Tala, Jalisco, Mexico, son of Arturo Muñoz Sánchez, a professional wrestler better known under the ring names Toro Blanco, Poder Boriqua, Poder Mexico, Comandante Pierroth, and La Bestia del Ring over the years. Both Muñoz's older and younger brother would also grow up to become professional wrestlers, with the oldest of the brothers, William, making his wrestling debut in 2008 and later becoming known as "Rush". His younger brother made his debut in November 2013, adopting the name Dragon Lee that he had used early in his career. Muñoz's uncles are also professional wrestlers, known as Franco Columbo, Pit Bull I and Pit Bull II, and all had a hand in training him prior to his debut.

Championships and accomplishments

Consejo Mundial de Lucha Libre
 CMLL World Tag Team Championship (1 time) – with Carístico
CMLL World Trios Championship (2 times) – with Máscara Dorada and Valiente (1), and Valiente and Volador Jr. (1)
CMLL World Welterweight Championship (1 time)
CMLL Bodybuilding Contest – Beginners (2010)
Copa 60 Aniversario de la Arena Puebla (2013)
Torneo Increíble de Parejas (2016) – with Mephisto
Torneo Sangre Nueva (2012)
Kaoz Lucha Libre
Kaoz Tag Team Championship (1 time) - with Dragon Lee
Lucha Libre Azteca
LLA Azteca Championship (1 time)
Lucha Libre AAA Worldwide
AAA World Tag Team Championship (1 time) - with Dragon Lee
New Japan Pro-Wrestling
Torneo de Parejas Familiares (2019) – with Dragon Lee
Pro Wrestling Illustrated
 Ranked No. 119 of the top 500 singles wrestlers in the PWI 500 in 2021
Pro Wrestling Revolution
PWR Tag Team Championship (1 time) - with Dragon Lee
 The Crash Lucha Libre
 The Crash Tag Team Championship (1 time) - with Dragon Lee

Footnotes

References

External links

CMLL profile 

1991 births
Living people
Masked wrestlers
Mexican male professional wrestlers
Místico
Professional wrestlers from Jalisco
21st-century professional wrestlers
CMLL World Tag Team Champions
CMLL World Trios Champions
CMLL World Welterweight Champions